Poehlman House, also known as Poehlman Residence, was designed by Ward Wellington Ward.  It was added to the National Register of Historic Places in 1997.

It was listed for its Colonial Revival and Arts and Crafts architecture. An Arts and Crafts style detail is the use of moon influences in the decorative shutters on the house.  It is located in the Scottholm Tract Historic District.

References

Houses in Syracuse, New York
National Register of Historic Places in Syracuse, New York
Houses on the National Register of Historic Places in New York (state)
Individually listed contributing properties to historic districts on the National Register in New York (state)
Houses completed in 1919